

Universities

Aryabhatta Knowledge University, Patna
Patna University, Patna
Chanakya National Law University, Patna
Patliputra University, Patna
Amity University, Patna
Maulana Mazharul Haque Arabic and Persian University
Nalanda Open University, Patna
Bihar Animal Sciences University

Engineering

Bakhtiyarpur College of Engineering, Patna (BCE PATNA)
Indian Institute of Technology, Patna
National Institute of Technology, Patna
Birla Institute of Technology, Patna
Maulana Azad College of Engineering and Technology
Netaji Subhas Institute of Technology, Bihta
Patna Sahib College of Engineering & Technology, Vaishali
R.P. Sharma Institute of Technology

Government polytechnic in patna
Government Polytechnic Patna-7

Management/IT
 Amity Global Business School
 Catalyst Institute of Management and Advance Global Excellence (CIMAGE)
 Chandragupt Institute of Management
 Cybotech Campus
 Development Management Institute
 Department of FMS, National Institute of Fashion Technology, Patna
 International School of Management Patna
 St. Xavier's College of Management and Technology
 Lalit Narayan Mishra Institute of Economic Development and Social Change

Medical Science
 All India Institute of Medical Sciences, Patna
 Indira Gandhi Institute of Medical Sciences
 Nalanda Medical College & Hospital
 National Institute of Health Education & Research Patna
 Patna Medical College and Hospital (earlier Prince of Wales Medical College)
 Rajendra Memorial Research Institute of Medical Sciences (under ICMR)

Dental Science
 Patna Dental College

General
 Anugrah Narayan College, Patna
 Bihar National College
 Magadh Mahila College
 Paras Nath Kushwaha College
 Patna College
 Patna Women's College
 St. Xavier's College, Patna
 Vanijya Mahavidyala

Design/Fashion
College of Arts and Crafts, Patna
National Institute of Fashion Technology, Patna

Others
 Asian Development Research Institute
 British Lingua
 Patna Law College
 Patna Women's Training College
 Patna Training College
 St. Xavier's College of Education
 Bihar Institute of Law
 Bihar Urdu Academy
 Oriental college, Patna city
 Sri Guru Gobind Singh College, Patna

Schools of Patna

See also
 List of educational institutions in Bihar
 Education in Bihar
 List of schools in India

References

Institutions
Patna-related lists
Patna